Racepath Branch is a stream in the U.S. state of Georgia. It is a tributary to Persimmon Creek.

A variant name is "Racepath Creek". Racepath Branch most likely was named for a mill race along its course.

References

Rivers of Georgia (U.S. state)
Rivers of Rabun County, Georgia